Jaroslav Kulhavý (born 8 January 1985 in Ústí nad Orlicí), is a Czech mountain biker

Career
For the first time, he became more aware of himself in 2003, when he became junior champion of the world and Europe. As a result, he also looked at the 2004 Olympics in Athens, but the Olympic race did not finish due to the defect. In 2008 he entered the Elite category and gradually began to overcome the best results of the Czech bikers. At the World Championships in St. Petersburg, Wendel finished eleventh, improving three places to the best Czech result of Miloslav Kvasnička in 1991.In 2009, he finished the 11th European Championship, at the World Cup in Canberra, Australia, the ninth. The medal position in the World Cup race has not been successful yet. In 2010, the first major medal successes came. In July, he won the title of European Champion in Israeli Haifa.At the Olympic Games in Rio in 2016 he defended the gold in the cross country race. Shortly after the start, he entered the front group and gradually formed a leading couple along with Nino Schurter, who was slowly passing by. In the penultimate sixth lap, Kulhavý was unable to respond to the arrival of a Swiss cyclist and a gap grew gradually between the two rivals. Jaroslav Kulhavý, however, watched his second place and won the silver medal.

He won the gold medal in the cross-country event at the 2012 Summer Olympics and the silver medal four years later at the 2016 Summer Olympics. He is the overall winner of the UCI World Cup in 2011, along with taking 3rd place in 2010 and 2012. In 2013 and 2015 Kulhavy partnered with Christoph Sauser to win the Absa Cape Epic mountain bike stage race ("Tour de France of mountain biking") Kulhavy raced the Absa Cape Epic with Sauser again in March, 2017, but their bid for a third win together was foiled by Nino Schurter and Matthias Stirnemann (Scott-Sram), who eventually prevailed by eight minutes. In June 2014 he took the world title in mountain bike marathon. At the Olympic Games in Rio in 2016 he came in second in the cross country race. Shortly after the start, he entered the front group and gradually formed a leading couple along with Nino Schurter, who was slowly passing by. In the penultimate sixth lap, Kulhavý was unable to respond to the arrival of a Switzerland cyclist and a gap grew gradually between the two rivals. Jaroslav Kulhavý, however, watched his second place and won the silver medal.

Major results

2003
 1st  Cross-country, UCI World Junior Championships
 1st  Cross-country, UEC European Junior Championships
2007
 2nd  Cross-country, UEC European Under-23 Championships
 3rd Overall UCI Under-23 XCO World Cup
2008
 1st  Cross-country, National Championships
2010
 1st  Cross-country, UEC European Championships
 1st  Marathon, National Championships
 2nd  Cross-country, UCI World Championships
 3rd Overall UCI XCO World Cup
1st Windham
2nd Champéry
3rd Offenburg
2011
 1st  Cross-country, UCI World Championships
 1st  Cross-country, UEC European Championships
 1st  Overall UCI XCO World Cup
1st Dalby Forest
1st Mont-Sainte-Anne
1st Windham
1st Nové Město
1st Val di Sole
2nd Offenburg
3rd Pietermaritzburg
 2nd  Marathon, UCI World Championships
2012
 1st  Cross-country, Olympic Games
 3rd Overall UCI XCO World Cup
2nd Nové Město
2nd La Bresse
3rd Mont-Sainte-Anne
2013
 1st  Overall Cape Epic (with Christoph Sauser)
 UCI XCO World Cup
1st Hafjell
3rd Albstadt
3rd Val di Sole
2014
 1st  Marathon, UCI World Championships
 2nd  Marathon, UEC European Championships
2015
 1st  Marathon, UEC European Championships
 1st  Overall Cape Epic (with Christoph Sauser)
 2nd Overall UCI XCO World Cup
1st Nové Město
1st Lenzerheide
3rd Albstadt
2016
 2nd  Cross-country, Olympic Games
 2nd  Cross-country, UCI World Championships
2017
 UCI XCO World Cup
2nd Lenzerheide
2018
 1st  Overall Cape Epic (with Howard Grotts)
2019
 1st  Overall Outcast Rider, Cape Epic
2022
 1st  Marathon, National Championships
 3rd  Marathon, UEC European Championships

World Cup of Mountain Bikes XCO

References 
 https://cs.wikipedia.org/wiki/Jaroslav_Kulhav%C3%BD
 http://jaroslavkulhavy.cz/
 http://isport.blesk.cz/clanek/ostatni-cyklistika/286856/kral-cyklistiky-kulhavy-doufam-ze-pristi-rok-stihnu-vedle-zavodu-i-svatbu.
 http://www.ahaonline.cz/clanek/sport/82168/jaroslav-kulhavy-ztratil-kamarada-cyklistu-standera-25-zabilo-auto-citim-se-hrozne.html

1985 births
Living people
Czech male cyclists
Cross-country mountain bikers
Olympic cyclists of the Czech Republic
People from Ústí nad Orlicí
Cyclists at the 2004 Summer Olympics
Cyclists at the 2008 Summer Olympics
Cyclists at the 2012 Summer Olympics
Cyclists at the 2016 Summer Olympics
Olympic medalists in cycling
Olympic gold medalists for the Czech Republic
Medalists at the 2012 Summer Olympics
UCI Mountain Bike World Champions (men)
Cape Epic winners
Olympic silver medalists for the Czech Republic
Sportspeople from the Pardubice Region